is a Japanese idol singer and former child actress. She is a member of the girl group AKB48, serving as captain of AKB48 Team A, and is also the third and current AKB48 Group . As an actress, she is best known for portraying Mio Sato in the Unfair television series and films.

Biography 
Mukaichi was born in Saitama Prefecture. She played tennis from 1st grade in elementary school right up to 3rd grade in junior high school.

Career 
Mukaichi was a child actress, represented by the talent agency Central G. She quit in fifth grade to concentrate on her studies and returned after entering junior high school, represented by talent agency Ii Concept. She appeared in a number of television dramas, such as Unfair (2006), and movies, such as Unfair: The Movie (2007).

In January 2013, Mukaichi took part and passed the AKB48 15th generation auditions, joining the group as a trainee member. She was promoted to Team 4 In February 2014, during the group's Daisokaku Matsuri team assignment event and concert. In April 2014, Mukaichi was selected as the new center (lead performer) for the song "Heavy Rotation" after being nominated by original center Yuko Oshima, who was about to leave the group. She joined a title track lineup, or senbatsu, for the first time for the group's 38th single title track "Kibouteki Refrain".

Mukaichi appeared in the series , starring fellow AKB48 members Nana Owada, Rina Kawaei, and Juri Takahashi, as a guest role in episode 2. Outside the group, she starred in the movie Unfair: The End, the final part of the Unfair series, which was released in September 2015. Producer , who did not know Mukaichi joined AKB48, said Mukaichi's role was a very important one and that even if Mukaichi has quit the entertainment industry, he would want her to return for this role.

Mukaichi was appointed as center for the group's 44th single title track "Tsubasa wa Iranai" which was released on June 1, 2016. In AKB48 Group's general elections in the same year, she placed 13th with 47,094 votes and entered the senbatsu in AKB48 45th single.

In June 2018, she placed 13th in that year's elections and revealed that she aimed to become the next General Manager of AKB48 Group. In December, during the 13th anniversary celebration of the group at the AKB48 Theater, current General Manager Yui Yokoyama nominated Mukaichi as her successor and stated that she would remain to guide her until she was ready to take over the position. Mukaichi officially assumed the General Manager position on April 1, 2019.

On January 21, 2020, to commemorate AKB48's fifteenth anniversary, Mukaichi launched the AKB48 individual YouTube channels project, where members would produce their own YouTube channels to express their individual appeal to the general public, following the cancellation of long-running AKB48 television shows such as AKBingo! and AKB48 Show!

On December 8, 2021, she was appointed the new captain of Team A during AKB48's 16th Anniversary performance, which she will serve in addition to her role as General Manager.

Discography

AKB48 singles

Appearances

Stage units
AKB48 Kenkyusei Stage 
 
Team 4 3rd Stage

TV variety
 SMAP X SMAP (2005)
 AKBingo! (2013–2019)
  (2013-2016)
  (2014-2016)
  (2014– )
  (2014)
  (2014-2015)

TV dramas
  (2002), young Hatsu
  (2002), Yumi's Daughter
 Unfair (2006), Sato Mio
  (2006), Fujiyoshi Juri
  (2007), Kawamura Kaya
  (2007) 
  (2007)
  (2014), Giant zombie (Ep 2)
  (2015), Jisedai (Team Hinabe)
  (2015), Jisedai (Team Hinabe)
  Ep.21 - Big Sister (2015), Ikuko
  Episode 8 (2015) as Mayu Izumi
  Ep.37 - Dangerous Two-seaters (2016), Mirai
  (2016), Nami Katayama
  (2016), Jisedai (Fugu)
  (2017), Mion Mukaichi/Strawberry Mukaichi, Blackberry Mukaichi
  (2018), Bara/Ikumi Kuwabara

Movies
 Bayside Shakedown 2 (2003), Rikako
 Unfair: The Movie (2007), Sato Mio
  (2008), Haruka
  (2008)
 Unfair: The End (2015), Sato Mio

Educational
  (2014- )

Magazines
 Love Berry'', Tokuma Shoten 2001-2012 and 2015-, as an exclusive model since December 2015

References

External links 

 AKB48 Official Profile
 Mama&Son Profile
 Mion Mukaichi on Twitter
 Mion Mukaichi on Instagram

1998 births
Living people
Japanese idols
Japanese women pop singers
Musicians from Saitama Prefecture
AKB48 members
21st-century Japanese women singers
21st-century Japanese singers
21st-century Japanese actresses
Japanese child actresses